Meat Market is the second EP by Battery, released in 1992 by COP International. The artwork for the release was accidentally switched with Nothing by Diatribe.

Music
After the members of Battery graduated college Shawn Brice and Evan Sornstein moved out to San Francisco, with former vocalist Stuart Scanlon leaving the band to work on 3D graphics in New York. The band knew Maria Azevedo for being the roommate of former member Evan Sornstein's sister at college. The band wanted to introduce a feminine angle to what they considered the male dominated genere of industrial music and recruited Azevedo as their vocalist after she informed them of her singing ability and auditioned her during a life performance. Azevedo debuted in the recording studio with the band on the track "Communion", which she co-wrote. Azevedo was formerly untrained at the time and received professional vocal lessons after the release of the band's 1993 debut Mutate to acquire confidence touring. When Industrialnation asked founding member Evan Sornstein about the band's place in the then current industrial music scene, he said:

Reception
Industrial Reviews gave Eternal Darkness four stars out of five and praised the thoughtfulness, energy and charm across the EP's four compositions, especially on the lead and coda tracks.

Track listing

Personnel
Adapted from the Meat Market liner notes.

Battery
 Maria Azevedo – instruments, lead vocals (3)
 Shawn Brice – instruments, vocals (1, 2), production (3, 4), backing vocals (3)
 Evan Sornstein (Curium Design) – instruments, vocals (1, 2), cover art, photography, typography, production (3, 4), backing vocals (3)

Production and design
 Christian Petke (as Count Zero) – production (1, 2)

Release history

References

External links 
 

1992 EPs
Battery (electro-industrial band) albums
COP International EPs